The NCAA Division III Women's Golf Championships, played in May, are the annual competitions in women's collegiate golf for individuals and teams from universities in Division III. It is a stroke play team competition with an additional individual award.

A combined Division II and Division III championship was held from 1996 to 1999, splitting into separate championships starting in 2000.

The most successful program, by far, has been Methodist, who have won 17 national titles, 15 of which were won consecutively between 1998 and 2012, and are the current champions.

Results

Divisions II and III combined (1996–1999)

Division III only (2000–present)

 † Only three of the four scheduled rounds were played

Multiple winners

Team
The following schools have won more than one team championship:
17: Methodist
3: Rhodes

Individual champion
The following women have won more than one individual championship:
2: Susan Martin, Shanna Nagy, Charlotte Williams

Individual champion's school
The following schools have produced more than one individual champion:
8 champions: Methodist
3 champions: Florida Southern
2 champions: Williams

See also
AIAW Intercollegiate Women's Golf Champions
NAIA Women's Golf Championship
National Golf Coaches Association

References

External links
NCAA Division III women's golf

Golf, Women's
College golf in the United States
Team golf tournaments
Amateur golf tournaments in the United States
Women's golf tournaments in the United States